Dallan is a given name and surname. Notable people with this name include:
 Dallán mac Breasal, 5th century Irish king
 Dallan Forgaill, 6th century Irish saint
 Dallán mac Móre, 8th–9th century Irish poet
 Dallan Muyres (born 1987), Canadian curler
 Dallan Murphy (born 1988), Australian rugby player
 Denis Dallan (born 1978), Italian rugby player
 Manuel Dallan (born 1976), Italian rugby player

Irish masculine given names